PZC may refer to:

Point of zero charge, a concept relating to the phenomenon of adsorption in physical chemistry 
Provinciale Zeeuwse Courant, a Dutch newspaper for the region of Zeeland
Providence Zen Center, the international headquarters for the Kwan Um School of Zen
PZ Cussons, a manufacturer of personal healthcare products and consumer goods